{{DISPLAYTITLE:C3H9NO3S}}
The molecular formula C3H9NO3S (molar mass: 139.173 g/mol, exact mass: 139.0303 u) may refer to:

 Homotaurine
 N-Methyltaurine

Molecular formulas